So Blonde: Back to the Island is a point-and-click adventure game released for the Wii and Nintendo DS in 2010. It is not a sequel or spin-off, but a darker "what if?" scenario based on the 2008 PC game So Blonde, which also precedes Captain Morgane and the Golden Turtle, which was released in 2012.

Gameplay

Plot

Sunny Blonde is a 17-year-old who has been spoiled by her rich parents. On a cruise with her parents who are celebrating their wedding anniversary,  the ship is struck by lightning, and she is knocked overboard.

She finds herself stranded on a beach of a remote “Forgotten Island” in the Caribbean Sea. The dark side of the island, that is, where the pirates under command of Captain One-Eye have their hideout.

Development

So Blonde: Back to the Island was announced to be in development on August 23, 2008, a few months after the release of So Blonde. The game was explained to be a "What If..." scenario to find a balance between making So Blonde available to consoles while keeping it interesting for old fans at the same time. Because it follows the original story in broad strokes, So Blonde: Back to the Island reuses models, backgrounds, and art from the original game where applicable.

Voice recording was arranged by MAS Productions and took place in a two-week time span around October 2, 2009. The trailer of the game debuted at Gamescom in 2010.

Release

Reception

Being of a niche genre and only having an EU release there are very few reviews online. Almost all reviews of So Blonde: Back to the Island rate the game low-favorably, with the Wii version scoring mildly higher than the Nintendo DS version. The common opinion is that So Blonde: Back to the Island does well what it does, but all the same does nothing new.

References

External links
 

2010 video games
Nintendo DS games
Point-and-click adventure games
Single-player video games
Video game sequels
Video games developed in France
Video games featuring female protagonists
Video games set in the Caribbean
Wii games
Wizarbox games
DTP Entertainment games